Alphawest is a SingTel Optus Group company with its headquarters in Sydney, Australia. It has an Australia-wide support organisation which specialises in ICT systems development and provisioning, and the associated managed services.

History 
Alphawest can trace its roots back to 1986 when Edcom Pty Ltd commenced operations in Perth specialising in sales and support of personal computers.

Through some mergers and acquisitions, Alphawest was formed in 2003 and in 2004 was listed on the Australian Stock Exchange as Alphawest Limited (ASX code: ALW). The company focused on hardware sales and maintenance, network management, and development of financial and document management systems.

In July 2005 SingTel Optus announced it would acquire Alphawest Ltd. for A$25.9 million  and the buyout was completed in November 2005. Alphawest Services Pty Ltd is formally owned by Optus Networks Pty Ltd.  Optus Business Division transferred many staff into Alphawest and it is now a business unit within Optus Business, closely aligned with Optus Business sales and service operations.

References

External links
Alphawest Official Site now redirects to the Optus Business website.

Companies based in Sydney
Telecommunications companies of Australia
Technology companies established in 1986
Optus
Technology companies of Australia
Australian companies established in 1986